Manfred Molzberger (27 January 1936 in Gummersbach – 1 March 2003 in Gummersbach) was a German long jumper who competed in the 1960 Summer Olympics.

References

1936 births
2003 deaths
German male long jumpers
Olympic athletes of the United Team of Germany
Athletes (track and field) at the 1960 Summer Olympics
People from Gummersbach
Sportspeople from Cologne (region)